Thomas Warburton (1837–1909) was an English businessman. In 1870, he founded a grocery shop which became a bakery business, known today as Warburtons. It is now the largest bakery business in the United Kingdom, owned by Jonathon, Ross and Brett Warburton, the fifth generation of the family.

Personal life 
Warburton and his wife, Ellen Platt, opened their first shop, in Bolton's Bow Street, in 1870. Assisted by Thomas' brother, George, six years later, Ellen began baking bread, shortly after which the business was renamed Warburtons the Bakers. Their nephew, Henry, delivered the bread via horse and cart.

Thomas and Ellen's daughter, Sarah, died in 1879.

Warburton died in 1909, aged 71 or 72. His wife survived him by eleven years.

References 

1837 births
1909 deaths
19th-century English businesspeople
People from Bolton
Businesspeople from Lancashire
British retail company founders